Bagualia (meaning "wild horse" in Spanish, after Bagual Canyon, the type locality), is an extinct genus of eusauropod dinosaur, from the Early Jurassic Epoch in what is now Argentina. The type species, B. alba, was formally described in 2020.

Description
Remains of Bagualia consist of many bones from three individuals, including vertebrae from the neck, limb bones, as well as skull and teeth fragments. The size of Bagualia was likely brought on by a newly formed ecosystem and climate shifts, which were all caused by volcanic activity in the Southern hemisphere during the Early Jurassic. While the harsh climate and ashes drove most sauropodomorphs to extinction, Bagualia was able to adapt to newly-sprouted conifers and plants, using its long neck to snip plant matter from them while staying in place, conserving energy. Its teeth are surrounded by a thick layer of enamel, roughly 7x thicker than other extinct herbivores, enabling the animal to better shear conifer leaves. The digestive system of Bagualia was also a likely reason why it grew to such a large size, and another function of its long neck has been proposed: it may have dissipated heat in a similar fashion to how elephants use their ears.

Classification
Bagualia was placed in a phylogenetic analysis and emerged as an early member of Eusauropoda. Due to its provenance from the Cañadon Asfalto Formation, which is dated to the Toarcian, the describers see it as evidence of an eusauropod dominance after an Early Jurassic global warming event, replacing more basal sauropodomorphs. In 2021, Gomez, Carballido, and Pol published a more detailed study on the axial skeleton of Bagualia. The results of their phylogenetic analyses are displayed in the cladogram below:

References

Eusauropoda
Toarcian life
Early Jurassic dinosaurs of South America
Fossils of Argentina
Fossil taxa described in 2020
Jurassic Argentina